Puerto Rico Highway 723 (PR-723) is a rural road that goes from the municipality of Aibonito to southern Barranquitas via northeastern Coamo, Puerto Rico.

Route description
This highway consists of two lanes in all of the entire length, one per direction, due to its rural characteristics. It is also part of the Ruta Panorámica, offering scenic views of southern Puerto Rico and the Cordillera Central. Near this highway, the Battle of Asomante took place, where Spanish and American troops met forces as part of the Spanish–American War of 1898.

The following barrios are directly served by Puerto Rico Highway 723:

 Asomante, from PR-14 in Aibonito to the Coamo municipal limit
 Pulguillas, from the Aibonito municipal limit to the Hayales line
 Hayales, from the Pulguillas line to PR-143 on the Barranquitas municipal limit

Major intersections

See also

 List of highways numbered 723

References

External links
 

723